Hubertas Grušnys (19 June 1961 – 21 October 2006) was a Lithuanian businessman and media proprietor.

Grušnys was born in Vilnius.  From 1984, he studied at the Law Faculty of Vilnius University. In 1989, with a partner, Hubertas Grušnys launched the radio station "M-1", the first-ever private radio station in Lithuania and the post-communist Eastern Europe .
 
His business was focused on running radio stations and a national TV network LNK which he sold in 1998. Hubertas Grušnys owned three national and two regional radio stations in Lithuania. He was also vice-president of the Lithuanian Association of Broadcasters. He died in a private plane (Diamond DA42 Twin Star) crash near the Pociūnai Airport, Prienai.

References

Sources, external links 
Speakers and members of the jury at MITIL 02
Interview with H. Grušnys 
About aviation accident of H. Grušnys 

1961 births
2006 deaths
Lithuanian mass media owners
Vilnius University alumni
Businesspeople from Vilnius